Corfe Mullen Halt was a station in the English county of Dorset. It was located between Bailey Gate and Broadstone stations on the Somerset and Dorset Joint Railway. This section was built to enable trains to avoid the time-consuming reversal at Wimborne. The station consisted of a single platform and shelter lit by a solitary gas lamp.

History

The station was opened on 9 July 1928 by the Southern Railway. It became part of the Southern Region of British Railways when the railways were nationalised in 1948. The halt was closed in 1956 as part of an economy campaign. The line through the station continued to be used by passenger trains until 1966 and afterwards by goods trains for the terminal at Blandford Forum until 1969. Later that year the track was lifted.

The site was in a cutting, which has now been filled in and is the garden of a house.

Further reading

References 

 Ordnance Survey 1" to 1 mile map of area dated 1930.
 The station on navigable O.S. map

External links
http://www.trainweb.org/railwest/railco/sdjr/cmj.html
https://web.archive.org/web/20070624121432/http://www.sdjr.net/locations/corfe_mullen.html

Disused railway stations in Dorset
Former Somerset and Dorset Joint Railway stations
Railway stations in Great Britain opened in 1928
Railway stations in Great Britain closed in 1956
Corfe Mullen